The dorsal lingual veins are veins which drain the tongue.

Veins of the head and neck